A skyway, skybridge, skywalk, or sky walkway is an elevated type of pedway connecting two or more buildings in an urban area, or connecting elevated points within mountainous recreational zones. Urban skyways very often take the form of enclosed or covered footbridges that protect pedestrians from the weather. Open-top modern skyways in mountains now often have glass bottoms. Sometimes enclosed urban skywalks are made almost totally from glass, including ceilings, walls and floors. Also, some urban skyways function strictly as linear parks designed for walking.

In North America skyways are usually owned by businesses, and are therefore not public spaces (compare with sidewalk). However, in Asia, such as Bangkok's and Hong Kong's skywalks, they are built and owned separately by the city government, connecting between privately run rail stations or other transport with their own footbridges, and run many kilometers. Skyways usually connect on the first few floors above the ground-level floor, though they are sometimes much higher, as in Petronas Towers. The space in the buildings connected by skyways is often devoted to retail business, so areas around the skyway may operate as a shopping mall. Non-commercial areas with closely associated buildings, such as university campuses, can often have skyways and/or tunnels connecting buildings.

The Minneapolis Skyway System is the world's largest continuous system and spans  connecting 80 blocks in downtown Minneapolis, Minnesota, United States.

On a smaller scale, terminals of large airports are often connected by skywalk systems, as at Manchester Airport, United Kingdom; in many airports, retractable jet bridges provide a direct connection between airplanes and terminals.

Some cities have the equivalent of a skyway underground, and there are also mixed subway–skyway systems; see underground city.

Early examples 

 Florence, Italy, Vasari Corridor, connects Palazzo Vecchio to Uffizi and then to Palazzo Pitti, 16th century
 Venice, Italy, Bridge of Sighs, connects Doge's Palace and prison, 16th century
 Copenhagen, Denmark: skywalk connecting courts building to adjacent uses, 18th century
 Faaborg, Funen, Denmark: skywalk in centrum, 18th century

Environmental factors 

Besides pedestrian safety and convenience, the chief reasons assigned by urban planners for skywalk development are decrease of traffic congestion, reduction in vehicular air pollution and separation of people from vehicular noise. A number of cities (for example, Spokane, Washington) have given intricate analysis to skywalk systems employing computer models to optimize skywalk layout.

Negative impacts 
There is debate about the negative impact on urban areas of skyways. Robertson (1988) noted the negative impacts to street activities, and reductions to the property value at ground level. Woo (2012) found that skywalk systems could be negatively associated with promoting consumerism. Cui (2015) called for more research into the impact of skyways in developing countries.

Cities with notable systems

North America
There are significant skyway networks in many cities in the US Midwest, such as Minneapolis, Saint Paul, Des Moines, Cedar Rapids, Rochester, and Duluth. Most networks in North America are privately owned. Notable exceptions are skyways in Saint Paul and in New York (High Line), which are publicly owned.

Asia

Record holders

The highest cantilevered skybridge between separate buildings in the world is in the Raffles City Chongqing skyscrapers complex in Chongqing, China. The world's longest pedestrian hanging skywalk, at 430 meters, is the Zhangjiajie Glass Bridge, which sits between mountain peaks in China. The highest cantilevered skybridge as construction element of building exist atop of Kingdom Centre in Riyadh, Saudi Arabia.

The world's highest 2-story skybridge, 170 m above the ground and 58 m long, between the two towers on 41st and 42nd floors in Petronas Twin Towers dual skyscrapers in Kuala Lumpur, Malaysia, which also has an elevated, air-conditioned walkway from the Kuala Lumpur Convention Centre to Bukit Bintang shopping district. Malaysia also has the mountainarian tourist pedestrian glass-bottom Langkawi Sky Bridge in Kedah, Langkawi.

Other examples

One of the most famous similar cantilevered skybridges, that looks like uppered ship from the bird's-eye and submarine from the ground, known in Singapore's Marina Bay Sands resort complex of skyscrapers.

One of the most impressionable hanging pedestrian skybridges, supported by two giant hands, Golden Bridge now attracts tourists in Ba Na Hills near Da Nang, Vietnam.

In Bangkok, Thailand there are more than 5.4 km of covered wide dedicated elevated skywalks with lighting. These were developed due to lack of proper sidewalks as well as street hawkers and local merchants taking advantage of any sidewalk space as makeshift commercial real estate. Common reasons skywalks were built include to avoid street pollution, dust, wetness from food vendors and/or rain, potholes, long queues, crowds, and uneven pavement, supporting urbanism but probably most importantly, tourism receipts. Most skywalks connect to a BTS station and utilize space underneath the rail line and BTS pillar supports. These skywalks have connector ramps which connect stations to malls seamlessly and are paid for by the malls themselves, otherwise the city and BTS fund walkway development. A 50km long extension project was shelved in 2011 due to funding issues, nevertheless the system is growing organically.

In Hong Kong, there are numerous foot bridge networks across the city. Particularly large networks exists around elevated or at grade MTR stations and connections between malls and housing estates in new town centers. The largest network spans Admiralty, Central and parts of Sheung Wan districts in the CBD and consists of the Central Elevated and Central–Mid-Levels Walkway systems which link up over 40 major office buildings. The Central–Mid-Levels walkway system is the longest outdoor covered escalator system in the world according to Guinness World Records.[9][10] Other large systems exist in Tsuen Wan and Mong Kok.

The Mumbai Skywalk Project, India is a discontinuous network of over 50 km of skywalks in Mumbai Metropolitan Region, India. The skyways connect Mumbai Suburban Railway stations to important junctions, each 1 to 2 km in length. The first of these is a 1.3 km (0.8 mi) long skywalk connecting the suburban regions of Bandra and Kurla.

Additionally, short skyways are used to connect buildings in other Asian locations.

Europe

Brussels, Belgium has a skyway between the two Belgacom Towers.

London has skywalks on the Barbican Estate and London Wall. The City of London Pedway Scheme was devised as part of the post World War II reconstruction plans for London, it was put into effect mainly from the mid-1950s to the mid-1960s and eventually abandoned by the 1980s. Shad Thames has picturesque skyways between former warehouses, used in part to roll barrels between them.

The twin towers of the Highlight Towers in Munich, Germany are joined by two skyways made of glass and steel.

The Promenade Plantée in the 12th arrondissement of Paris, France includes pedestrian bridges and a linear park on an aqueduct of a former railway.

Australia
 Melbourne, Australia, four blocks and Airport

Gallery

See also 
 Catwalk – A narrow footbridge or walkway to allow workers access to parts of a structure
 Footbridge – A bridge for pedestrians
 Hyatt Regency walkway collapse – A failure of an internal skyway
 Overpass – A bridge, road or railway crossing over another road or railway
 Pedestrian separation structure – Any structure which separates pedestrians from the roadway
 Pedway – Pedestrian walkways, includes both skyways and underground walkways
 Sidewalk – Pedestrian path along the side of a road

References

External links 
 

 
 
Bridges
Pedestrian infrastructure
Rooms
Urban studies and planning terminology